Ho Chi Minh City University of Architecture, is the flagship university in architecture, civil engineering, design education and research in Vietnam. In addition to architecture and civil/structural engineering, the university provides higher education in several relating disciplines including urban planning, infrastructural engineering, fine arts, fashion design and building interior design. Its main campus is located in District 3, Ho Chi Minh City in addition to two provincial campuses in Da Lat and Can Tho.

The university can trace its history back to the institution founded in 1924 as the Ecole des Beaux Art. After multiple times of relocation, reforms and closure due to war, the university received its current name in 1976 and has come under the management of the Ministry of Construction (Vietnam) since 2002.

During the past Ho Chi Minh City University of Architecture have trained over 1,100 technical personnel with Bachelor and PhD degrees; 35,000 architects, engineers, etc. Most of students were employed after graduating.

History
1924 - L'ecole des Beaux Arts de L'Indochichine (Indochina Art School) Vietnamese language: Trường Mỹ thuật Đông Dương was founded in Ha Noi
1926 - Department of Architecture was first opened in the Ecole des Beaux Art
1944 - The school was relocated to Da Lat and renamed as Architectural School of Da Lat French Language: l'École supérieure d'architecture de Dalat
1948 - The Architecture School of Da Lat was merged into the Indochina University Université Indochinoise and renamed as College of Architecture
1950 - The school was relocated to Saigon and separated from L’École des Beaux-Arts de Paris
1976 - The school received its current name, Ho Chi Minh City University of Architecture

Facilities 
Ho Chi Minh City University of Architecture is located at the center of town. It has classical architecture from 1972.

Classrooms fully equipped with computers, projectors and wifi.
Information Technology classrooms with individual desktops for each student.
A library with all the books the students need for their studies.
A Self-studying and social area for students to relax in their free time.

Main campus at 196 Pasteur
The main campus of Ho Chi Minh City University of Architecture was built in 1972 and is still in use today. The design was originally a final year project of Trương Văn Long, at that time, a student under supervision of Professor Phạm Văn Thâng.

External collaborations
Collaborative programs the university is involved include:
Sandwich courses in industrial design and civil engineering with Australian Swinburne University of Technology
Sandwich post graduate course in urban planning with Asian Institute of Technology
Advanced urban design course, in collaboration with Katholieke Universiteit Leuven

References

External links
 Official Website

Universities in Ho Chi Minh City